Colleen Margaret Mullen (born June 19, 1980) is an American college basketball coach and former player. She is the head coach of the Albany women's basketball team.

High school 
Mullen played basketball and volleyball at Chelmsford High School in North Chelmsford, Massachusetts. She earned a letter in each of her four years as a basketball player. In her sophomore year she was named captain of the team and remained as captain through her junior and senior years. She earned MVP honors for her team in each of her last three years, and as a senior earned honorable mention All–USA Today honors. As a volleyball player, she lettered three times and help the team to the Division I North championship in her junior and senior years. As a volleyball player, she earned Globe All-Scholastic honors, and captained each of her three seasons.

College 
Mullen enrolled at the University of Rhode Island, where she played point guard and started all 27 games as a freshman. In her sophomore year, she averaged 9.5 points per game, second best on the team, and hit 86% of her free throws, best on the team.

After her sophomore year she transferred to the University of New Hampshire, where she sat out for one year due to transfer rules. She is in the school's top 20 for three-point field goals made and assists over her career despite only being at the school for two years. She earned a place on the America East honor roll in both her junior and senior years. Mullen was named captain of the team both year at UNH. While at New Hampshire, she earned a Bachelor of Science in business administration.

Coaching 
Even while playing in high school, Mullen knew she wanted a career as a basketball coach. She said, "Even as a young player, in my freshman year, I felt like I was trying to be a coach on the floor...That was my dream, what I wanted to do."

Her first coaching position was at Northern Illinois, where she worked as the director of basketball operations for the 2004–05 season. In 2005, she was hired as an assistant basketball coach at Southern New Hampshire University. She remained there for two seasons. While at SNHU, she found time to complete her master's in business administration.

Mullen then spent a year as an assistant at Lehigh. After Lehigh, she served as an assistant for two seasons at Long Island University.

Mullen then went on to Army, where she remained for seven years. She was hired as an assistant coach in 2011, but was named associate head coach the following year. She primarily worked with the guards, including Kelsey Minato, who was the first player in Patriot League history to earn awards for both player and rookie of the year in the same year. Minato also earned All-America honorable mention by the AP and the WBCA as well as ESPN W mid-major player of the year.

In 2018, Mullen was named the new head coach of the Albany women's basketball team.

Head coaching record

References

External links
 Official biography, Albany Great Danes

Living people
1980 births
American women's basketball coaches
Army Black Knights women's basketball coaches
Albany Great Danes women's basketball coaches
Lehigh Mountain Hawks women's basketball coaches
American women's basketball players
Basketball coaches from Massachusetts
Basketball players from Massachusetts
LIU Brooklyn Blackbirds women's basketball coaches
Southern New Hampshire Penmen women's basketball coaches
People from Chelmsford, Massachusetts
Point guards
Chelmsford High School alumni
University of New Hampshire alumni
Sportspeople from Middlesex County, Massachusetts
21st-century American women